Skånetrafiken is the regional public transit district in Skåne län, in the south of Sweden.

Skånetrafiken was founded in 1999 when the two counties Kristianstads län and Malmöhus län were merged into one region, causing the two respective transport authorities for each previous county to be amalgamated. Presently, Skånetrafiken is a part of the regional government of Region Skåne.

The main office is located in Hässleholm with a second office in Lund. The managing director of Skånetrafiken is Magnus Hedin.

Public transport services 

Skånetrafiken organise train services on several lines within Skåne, called Pågatåg, which are currently delivered under contract by Arriva. These are supplemented by the Öresundståg, regional train services managed by Skånetrafikken, which cross into Denmark and neighbouring counties in Sweden. The Öresundståg network in both Denmark and Sweden is from 11. December 2022 operated by Transdev. Before the 11. December 2022, the Öresundståg was operated by DSB and SJ Öresund in cooperation

Urban bus services are available in 10 cities and towns in Skåne with the majority of services in Malmö, Helsingborg and Lund. Regional buses routes that connect cities and town operate throughout Skåne. A colour scheme is used to distinguish urban from regional/inter-urban buse: the former are green whereas the latter are yellow. On a similar principle, Pågatåg trains are painted mauve with a red stripe, while Öresundståg vehicles are primarily silver-grey.

Depending on the results of the bidding process, different bus companies are awarded contracts for bus lines. The principal bus companies running bus services for Skånetrafiken are Veolia Transport, Arriva, Nobina Sverige, and Bergkvarabuss.

Some services for transportation of handicapped people are also run by Skånetrafiken under the name of Serviceresor. Additionally, Skånetrafiken operates a boat service between Landskrona harbour and the island of Ven.

Buses to/from airports are not formally a part of Skånetrafiken at this time.

Some train and bus services between Skåne and the adjoining counties of Blekinge, Halland and Kronoberg are organised in conjunction with corresponding regional transit authorities in the respective counties.

Skånetrafiken is also the brand used for the Lund tramway.

Tickets, prices and ticketing system 

Since Skånetrafiken manages all public transport in Skåne, tickets are valid on all local trains and buses.  Furthermore, a passenger can buy a ticket on an urban bus in one city for a combined ride by bus – train – bus to a final destination in another city.  This ease of ticketing may have been a contributing factor to the positive development in patronage since the inception of Skånetrafiken in 1999.

Within the city bus systems tickets are sold at a fixed price for the entire city. For journeys which fall outside these zones pricing is based on the distance of the journey, with prices increasing along with the distance.

Tickets can be purchased as single or all-day journeys, or in different forms of pre-paid passes. All tickets are sold within the app. On regional buses tickets for single journeys can also be bought from the driver, while city buses accept tap-to-pay debit and credit cards. On trains, passengers must buy a ticket before boarding from machines on or near the platform or within the Skånetrafiken app. Those with a fixed-term ticket can board the train directly. 

For those who do not wish to buy single-journey tickets and who cannot use the app Skånetrafiken also provides a contactless travel card. The travel card can be filled with tickets at Skånetrafiken Customer Centres, online on the Skånetrafiken webpage or at an affiliated organization. 

For travel to and from Denmark, tickets can be purchased directly with Skånetrafiken, either within the app or on the travel card. Fares that include a border crossing will include unlimited use of local public transit on each side within the validity period of the ticket (a paper receipt needs to be printed if using a Skånetrafiken travel card as the card is incompatible with the Danish Rejsekort system; app users can just show the electronic ticket when boarding buses and if asked while on trains).

Criticism 

The entire ticketing system in Skåne was switched in 2009 when the debit card and 30-day commuter cards have been merged into a common smart card system. Originally, this conversion was planned to be operational by 2007.

Skånetrafiken has been criticised, particularly in 2007, for not being sufficiently quick and decisive in response to increases in patronage. The success of some routes has been so good that overcrowding has plagued some train and bus services for months with no response on the part of Skånetrafiken; this has been particularly the case for rush-hour train service to and from Denmark. There was more criticism during 2009/2010 for crowding in the Malmö station which was being rebuilt. Skånetrafiken claims to have made changes in internal decision procedures to catch these problems more quickly in the future. The Malmö Central station has no room for more trains until a new tunnel is opened in the winter 2010–2011. It is not possible to rent or buy any old train for the traffic to Denmark, since both rail authorities have many requirements meaning custom made trains must be bought. New trains have now been ordered.

See also
List of regional bus routes in Skåne County

References

External links 
 

Public transport authorities of Sweden
Railway companies of Sweden
Transport in Skåne County
Swedish companies established in 1999